Somewhere in Wrong is a 1925 American film starring Stan Laurel.

Cast
 Stan Laurel as A Tramp
 Max Asher as A Tramp
 Julie Leonard as The Farmer's Daughter
 Charles King as A Suitor
 Pete the Dog (as Pete the Pup)

See also
 List of American films of 1925

References

External links

Somewhere in Wrong at SilentEra

1925 films
American silent short films
American black-and-white films
1925 comedy films
1925 short films
Films directed by Joe Rock
Films directed by Scott Pembroke
Silent American comedy films
American comedy short films
1920s American films